The VNS Volleyball Club Griffins (originally, the Volleyball Never Stops Volleyball Club) are a professional men's volleyball team in the Philippines playing the Spikers' Turf. It previously played under various sponsorships.

History
Volleyball Never Stops or VNS was established in 2013 by a group of team captains who played volleyball either at the University Athletic Association of the Philippines (UAAP) or the National Collegiate Athletic Association (NCAA) as a means to be still able to play competitive volleyball even after they graduated from college. They often took part in exhibition games and various minor tournaments and were joined in by other UAAP and NCAA graduates.

In 2016, they were invited to take part in the semi-professional men's volleyball league, Spikers' Turf. They played under the name of their sponsor Bounty Fresh in their debut at the 2016 Open Conference. For the season-ending 2016 Reinforced Conference they under the banner of another sponsor as the 100 Plus Active Spikers. In 2017, they joined the Premier Volleyball League, and took part as the Café Lupe Sunrisers for the whole 2017 season.

They would return to the Spiker's Turf in 2018 as the Fury Blazing Hitters. In 2019, they played as the VNS Griffins.

In 2021, VNS would take part in the 2021 PNVF Champions League as the Manileño Spikers. The Spikes clinched the bronze medal in the tournament defeating Global Remit in the third place play off.

Name changes 
 Bounty Fresh (2016 Open)
 100 Plus Active Spikers (2016 Reinforced)
 Café Lupe Sunrisers (2017)
 Fury Blazing Hitters (2018)
 VNS Volleyball Club Griffins (2019)
 Manileño Spikers (2021)
 VNS-One Alicia Griffins (2022)

Current roster 

Coaching staff
 Head Coach: Ralph Ocampo
 Assistant Coach: Hans Chuacoco

Team Staff
 Team Manager:
 Team Utility: 

Medical Staff
 Team Physician:
 Physical Therapist:
 -->

Previous roster 

Coaching staff
 Head Coach: Ralph Ocampo
 Assistant Coach: Hans Chuacoco

Team Staff
 Team Manager:
 Team Utility: 

Medical Staff
 Team Physician:
 Physical Therapist:

Coaching staff
 Head Coach: Ralph Ocampo
 Assistant Coach: Bakhie Pareja

Team Staff
 Team Manager:
 Team Utility: 

Medical Staff
 Team Physician:
 Physical Therapist:

For the Premier Volleyball League 1st Season Open Conference:

Coaching staff
 Head Coach:Rodrigo Palmero
 Assistant Coaches:Ronald Dulay Mario Mia

Team Staff
 Team Manager:
 Team Utility: 

Medical Staff
 Team Physician:
 Physical Therapist:

For the Premier Volleyball League 1st Season Reinforced Open Conference:
 

Coaching staff
 Head Coach:John Pat de Guzman
 Assistant Coach: Ronald Dulay

Team Staff
 Team Manager:
 Team Utility: 

Medical Staff
 Team Physician:
 Physical Therapist:

Honors

2021 PNVF Champions League

Spikers' Turf / Premier Volleyball League

Notes

Individual
Spikers' Turf / Premier Volleyball League:

Team Captains 
 Ralph Raymund Ocampo (2016 - 2017)
 Phillip Michael Bagalay (2018)
 Geuel Asia (2019)
 John Benedict San Andres (2022)

Coaches 
 John Pat de Guzman (2016 – 2017)
 Rodrigo Palmero (2017)
 Ralph Raymund Ocampo (2018)

External links

References 

Premier Volleyball League (Philippines)
Sports teams in Metro Manila
2013 establishments in the Philippines
Men's volleyball teams in the Philippines